The 1970 Rothmans International Tennis Tournament was a men's professional tennis tournament held on indoor carpet courts in the Royal Albert Hall in London, England. It was the first edition of the tournament and was held from 4–7 March 1970. It was an independent event, i.e. not part of either the 1970 Grand Prix or 1970 World Championship Tennis circuit. Marty Riessen won both the singles and doubles competition and £2525 in prize money.

Finals

Singles
 Marty Riessen defeated  Ken Rosewall 6–4, 6–2

Doubles
 Tom Okker /  Marty Riessen defeated  Rod Laver /  Owen Davidson 6–3, 13–11, 9–11, 2–6, 7–5

Notes

References

1970
Rothmans International Tennis Tournament
Rothmans International Tennis Tournament
Rothmans International Tennis Tournament
Rothmans International Tennis Tournament